Bicuiba is a monotypic genus of flowering plants in the nutmeg family, Myristicaceae. The only species is Bicuiba oleifera, which is endemic to southeastern Brazil. It grows in the forests of the Atlantic coast.

References

Myristicaceae genera
Monotypic magnoliid genera
Endemic flora of Brazil
Endangered plants
Taxonomy articles created by Polbot